Maria "Ria" Geertruida Stalman (born 11 December 1951) is a retired discus thrower and shot putter from the Netherlands.

Biography
She won the gold medal in the discus throw at the 1984 Summer Olympics, which earned her the Dutch Sportswoman of the year award the same year. Between 1973 and 1983 she won medals, including 15 gold, in the discus throw and shot put at every national championships.

Stalman went to Arizona State University, where she was on the track and field team. She retired shortly after the 1984 Olympics to work as a journalist and athletics commentator with Eurosport.

In early 2016, Stalman admitted in a TV interview that she had been using doping when she won her 1984 gold medal. The results and records remain, because the offense is too old to prosecute.

In July 1984 she achieved her best discus throw of 71.22 m. This remained the Dutch record until November 2016, when the Royal Dutch Athletics Federation annulled the record due to doping violations.

References

External links

1951 births
Living people
Sportspeople from Delft
Dutch female discus throwers
Dutch female shot putters
Olympic athletes of the Netherlands
Olympic gold medalists for the Netherlands
Athletes (track and field) at the 1984 Summer Olympics
Medalists at the 1984 Summer Olympics
World Athletics Championships athletes for the Netherlands
Arizona State Sun Devils women's track and field athletes
Knights of the Order of Orange-Nassau
Olympic gold medalists in athletics (track and field)
Arizona State University alumni